So Danço Samba is the fourth album by keyboardist/composer-arranger Clare Fischer, and his first in the bossa nova vein, recorded and released in 1964 on the World Pacific label. Devoted primarily to the music of Antonio Carlos Jobim, it also features three of Fischer's own compositions.

Reception
In its review, American Record Guide commends both "Clare Fischer, a continually rewarding pianist from the West Coast," and his "unusually fine album of bossa nova selections."

Track listing
All compositions by Antonio Carlos Jobim except where noted.

Side One
 "So Danço Samba" - 2:55
 "Desafinado" - 2:59
 "Quiet Nights (Corcovado)" - 3:41
 "Pensativa" (Clare Fischer) - 4:21
 "Carnaval" (Clare Fischer) - 3:10
Side Two
 "Girl From Ipanema" - 3:32
 "Ornithardy" (Clare Fischer) - 2:56
 "O Amor em Paz" - 2:47
 "How Insensitive" - 3:19                                          
 "One Note Samba" - 4:22

Personnel
Clare Fischer - piano & organ
Dennis Budimir - guitar
Bob West - bass
Colin Bailey - drums

References

External links
 Album back cover image at livedoor Blog

1964 albums
Clare Fischer albums
World Pacific Records albums